Apostolos Kotsianoulis (born 29 January 2001) is a Greek professional footballer who plays as a forward for Super League 2 club Apollon Larissa.

References

2001 births
Living people
Greek footballers
Super League Greece players
Super League Greece 2 players
Athlitiki Enosi Larissa F.C. players
Apollon Larissa F.C. players
Association football forwards